Tsestos, is a challenging dance from Northern Greece (the region named Thrace or in Greek language Thraki. The dance starts with a moderate rhythm and is danced by both men and women with very few figure (this is an intro dance named dousko, the steps are the same with the dance zonaradiko. As it goes on, men come in front and they catch each other by the zonari (belt). At this point the dance becomes very quick and it consists of figures only.

See also
Greek music
Kalamatianos
Greek folk music
Greek dances
Tsamiko
Horon (dance)
Zonaradiko

Greek music
Greek dances